Steven, Stephen or Steve Stephens or Stevens could refer to: 

Stephen Stevens (1793–1870), American jurist and politician
Steve Stevens (footballer) (1903–1990), Australian rules footballer
Steve Stephens (1930–2021), American broadcaster
Steve Stevens (born 1959), American guitarist and songwriter
Steve William Stephens (1979–2017), American murderer known as the "Facebook killer"